Diaphus knappi, the small lanternfish, is a species of lanternfish found in the Indo-Pacific.

Size

Etymology
The fish is named in honor of Smithsonian ichthyologist Leslie W. Knapp (1929–2017), for providing the author with lanternfishes from both the Indian Ocean and Pacific Ocean.

References

Myctophidae
Taxa named by Basil Nafpaktitis
Fish described in 1978